Knut J. Olawsky is a German linguist and author of aspects of Dagbani language grammar. He chaired the Dagbani Orthography Committee in 1998 that developed a unified spelling system for the Dagbani language.

Publications 
Olawsky, Knut (1997) 'Interaction of tone and morphology in Dagbani' (unpublished)

References 

Linguists from Germany
Living people
Year of birth missing (living people)
Linguists of Dagbani